Beatrice Gyaman (born 17 February 1987) is a Ghanaian track and field athlete specialising in the sprinting events. She has won medals in the 4 × 100 metres relay at three African Championships, as well as the 2010 Commonwealth Games.

Education 
Gyaman studied basic education at the University of Cape Coast.

Competition record

Personal bests
Outdoor
100 metres – 11.75 (+0.2 m/s) (Gwangju 2015)
200 metres – 24.15 (+1.9 m/s) (Maputo 2011)
Long jump – 5.65 (+1.2 m/s) (New Delhi 2010)

References

1987 births
Living people
Ghanaian female sprinters
Athletes (track and field) at the 2010 Commonwealth Games
Athletes (track and field) at the 2014 Commonwealth Games
Athletes (track and field) at the 2015 African Games
Athletes (track and field) at the 2016 Summer Olympics
Olympic athletes of Ghana
Commonwealth Games medallists in athletics
Commonwealth Games silver medallists for Ghana
African Games silver medalists for Ghana
African Games medalists in athletics (track and field)
Competitors at the 2015 Summer Universiade
Olympic female sprinters
20th-century Ghanaian women
21st-century Ghanaian women
Medallists at the 2010 Commonwealth Games
University of Cape Coast alumni